Margaret Duchill was a Scottish woman who confessed to witchcraft at Alloa during the year 1658. She was one of several people who were accused of witchcraft during the trials of the Alloa witches between 1658 and 1659. The Alloa witch hunt began when the presbytery of Stirling met and appointed the Reverends Matthias Symson and George Bennet, to visit the town and investigate a group of suspected witches. Duchill was one of these woman who were investigated, and her case is a prime example of how an accused witch could bring other people into suspicion, as Duchill implicated many other women in the town as witches which fueled the witch hunting frenzy.

Not much is known about her life before her trial, however her socioeconomic status was described as middling, and she is known to have been a resident of Alloa. Her trial testimony involved mentions of demons, fairies and elements of maleficium.

Trial 
Duchill was imprisoned in the month May 1658 and interrogated. On the 11th of May her confession was read out during a kirk session. She had confessed to having been a servant of the devil for twenty years.

See also 

 Alloa witches

References 

18th-century Scottish people